Ivan Saveljić (born 17 August 1995) is a Montenegrin tennis player.

Saveljić has a career high ATP singles ranking of 1828 achieved on 27 October 2014. He also has a career high ATP doubles ranking of 1338 achieved on 17 November 2014.

Saveljić represents Montenegro at the Davis Cup, where he has a W/L record of 3–5.

External links

1995 births
Living people
Montenegrin male tennis players
Sportspeople from Podgorica
NC State Wolfpack men's tennis players